Maas Brothers was a leading Tampa, Florida department store founded by Abe and Isaac Maas in 1886  that grew from a small  store to a chain of 39 stores throughout the Gulf Coast of Florida. The Maas Brothers brand went defunct in 1991 when it was consolidated into the Burdines department store chain, which in turn merged with Macy's in 2005.

History 
Abe and Isaac Maas started their retail career in Cochran, Georgia, working with their brothers, Jacob and Sol. By 1880, Abe was operating a store in Dublin, Georgia, and Isaac was operating a millinery store in Ocala by 1885. In 1886, Abe decided to move to a better location and chose Tampa, at the time a small village on Florida's west coast. Abe had been quoted as saying, "It's a waterfront town. Who knows? It may amount to something someday." Abe Maas opened the Dry Goods Palace on December 10, 1886. His brother, Isaac, formally joined his brother on September 15, 1887, and the store became Maas Brothers. After outgrowing its first two locations, Maas Brothers opened its third, and largest, store in 1921.  This store was the second largest department store in Florida, and it contained the first escalator installed in Florida. By 1929, Maas Brothers dominated Florida's West Coast. It was known as "Greater Tampa's Greatest Store."

Allied Stores 
In 1929, Abe and Isaac Maas sold Maas Brothers to Hahn Department Stores.  Maas Brothers gained the buying power of the 28 department stores while Hahn gained the addition of another successful chain with a loyal customer base.  In 1935, Hahn Department Stores changed its name to Allied Stores Corporation.  Despite being owned by a national company, Maas Brothers was still operated by the Maas family. In 1935, Isaac Maas, who was serving as chairman of the board died at the age of 71. Abe Maas, who was president, became chairman. Jerome A. Waterman, Abe and Isaac's nephew, became president. Jerome joined Maas Brothers in 1907. Abe Maas died in 1941 at the age of 86.

Expansion 
In 1948, Maas Brothers opened its first full line branch store in downtown St. Petersburg. Other branch stores opened in downtown Lakeland in 1954, downtown Sarasota in 1956 and downtown Clearwater in 1961.  Maas Brothers opened its first mall store, in 1965, in the Edison Mall in Fort Myers.  By 1981, Maas Brothers opened its 17th store in Gulf View Square Mall in Port Richey.  This was the last Maas Brothers store built. In 1985, Maas Brothers absorbed the Savannah, Georgia based stores of fellow Allied nameplate Levy's of Savannah (founded in 1871 as B. H. Levy & Bro.).

Campeau takeover 
In 1986, Maas Brothers celebrated its 100th anniversary. It was in the same year that Canadian real estate developer Robert Campeau completed his takeover of Allied Stores Corporation. As part of liquidation and cost cutting, Maas Brothers was consolidated with the weaker Jordan Marsh Florida franchise on Florida's East Coast in 1987 (Allied's Jordan Marsh had expanded from New England in 1956, later forming a separate Allied division). The plan was that the stronger Maas Brothers would help the weaker Jordan Marsh. This brought the total number of combined stores to 39 throughout Florida, Georgia and South Carolina. In 1989 the official store name was changed to Maas Brothers/Jordan Marsh.

In 1988, Campeau launched a successful takeover battle with Macy's for Federated Department Stores. Ironically, Federated would acquire Macy's in 1994. With the acquisition of Federated, Maas Brothers' formal rival, Miami-based Burdines, became its sister store. As with the Allied acquisition, in order to cut costs, several back office operations for Maas Brothers, Jordan Marsh, and Burdines were consolidated.

Bankruptcy and merger 
By 1989, Federated and Allied were struggling to make its debt payments incurred from the takeovers. On January 16, 1990, Federated and Allied filed for Chapter 11 bankruptcy. Several underperforming stores were closed, including the flagship downtown Tampa store in February 1991. As part of its plan of reorganization, the Florida operations would be consolidated and several stores would be closed. The Maas Brothers/Jordan Marsh headquarters was closed and consolidated with Burdines in July 1991. On October 20, 1991, the Maas Brothers stores officially became Burdines. The majority of the former Jordan Marsh stores were sold off since they competed directly with Burdines. Burdines, along with the other Federated divisions except Bloomingdales, were converted to Macy's in 2005.

Former Locations

Disposition of the stores 

Many of the Maas Brothers stores developed as mall anchor stores remain as Macy's stores.  However, the downtown stores were closed and only one remains occupied today. 
 Sarasota.  The downtown Sarasota store was closed in 1991 was demolished in October 1996 to make way for a 20 screen theater. 
 St. Petersburg.  The downtown St. Petersburg enjoyed an interesting afterlife and redevelopment.  The store included its original store at the northeast corner of 1st Avenue and 3rd Street North (known as "The Sunshine Corner") and several expansions covering nearly an entire City block.  After closing of the store in 1991, the buildings sat vacant for a few years until they were leased to the Florida International Museum (FIM) from 1995 to 2005.  During its operation, the FIM borrowed funds from the city of St. Petersburg to purchase the property as a way to eliminate leasing expenses.  Although the 2008 Titanic exhibit drew 800,000 visitors to the FIM, the museum thereafter was unable to reach the attendance goals needed to support the limited run "blockbuster" exhibits which served as the centerpiece of the museum's programming.  Ultimately, the museum defaulted on its loans and the City took possession of the property.  As owner, the  City proposed an ambitious redevelopment plan that would include: 1) a new downtown campus for St. Petersburg College to be housed in the former Maas Brothers furniture store comprising nearly the entire north one-half of the block, with the FIM to operate a smaller, and hopefully more sustainable, museum in part of the college space; 2) redevelopment of the original store property at the "Sunshine Corner" with a new 16-story Florida operations headquarters for Progress Energy, Inc. (formerly Florida Power, then Florida Progress, and now merging with Duke Energy); and 3) redevelopment of the southeast corner of the block with a 29-story Grand Bohemian Hotel and condominium, proposed by Orlando-based Kessler Collection (neither the hotel nor the condominium ever broke ground and the lot is vacant).  In July and August 2005, after the City had reached agreements with the three proposed users, the original store and its east addition on the south one-half of the block were demolished to allow the Progress Energy headquarters to begin construction, and St. Petersburg College began modifications for conversion of the furniture store to an educational facility.  As a condition for construction of the new Progress Energy headquarters, City officials required the removal of the large vintage terrazzo and brass medallion inlaid into the sidewalk at what was the main entrance to the original store.  The medallion reads "The Sunshine Corner," and depicts a map of Florida and a sun with one very long brass ray reaching to touch this location in St. Petersburg.  When the Progress Energy Tower was completed, the medallion was reinstalled in its original location in the sidewalk to be preserved for future generations.

 Tampa.  In 2006 the downtown Tampa store after sitting empty and neglected for 15 years was demolished, to make room for a condo tower. After the real estate bust plans for condo were shelved and the property was sold and has become a parking lot.  
 Clearwater.  The downtown Clearwater store became the Harborview Center was scheduled to be demolished in May 2010. In August 2010 a film crew leased the building for five months filming the move "A Dolphin's Tale" giving the building a brief reprieve. 
 Lakeland.  The downtown Lakeland store remained open as Burdines until 1994 when it was relocated to Lakeland Square Mall. It serves as the headquarters for Watkins Trucking, now part of FedEx.

See also
List of defunct department stores of the United States

References

Further reading
Maas Brothers family history

Defunct department stores based in Florida
History of Tampa, Florida
Companies based in Tampa, Florida
Defunct companies based in Florida
American companies established in 1886
Retail companies established in 1886
Companies that filed for Chapter 11 bankruptcy in 1990
Retail companies disestablished in 1991
1886 establishments in Florida
1991 disestablishments in Florida